Alexander McKenzie may refer to:

 Alexander McKenzie (Medal of Honor) (1837–?), US Navy boatswain's mate and Medal of Honor recipient
 Alexander McKenzie (politician) (1851–1922), Canadian-born politician in early North Dakota
 Alexander McKenzie (chemist) (1869–1951), Scottish chemist
 Alexander McKenzie (artist) (born 1971), Australian contemporary artist
 Alexander McKenzie (footballer) (1870–1914), Australian rules footballer
 Alec McKenzie (1882–1968), Australian rules footballer
 Alex McKenzie (1896–1992), New Zealand sharebroker and political party president

See also 
 Alexander Mackenzie (disambiguation)
 Ali McKenzie (born 1981), English rugby union player
 Sandy MacKenzie (born 1973), Canadian ice hockey player